Team RadioShack was a professional road bicycle racing team, with RadioShack as the title sponsor, the creation of which was announced on July 23, 2009. Lance Armstrong co-owned and led the team, which raced in the Grand Tours and the UCI ProTour. The team was managed by Capital Sports and Entertainment, an Austin, Texas sports and event management group that also manages the Trek-Livestrong U23 development cycling team and that ran the former Discovery Channel Pro Cycling Team.

Johan Bruyneel was Team RadioShack's initial overall manager and Dirk Demol is the directeur sportif.  Former Discovery Channel cyclists Viatcheslav Ekimov from Russia and  José Azevedo from Portugal was also part of the managerial squad. Armstrong said that the team would promote the  Livestrong anti-cancer campaigns of his Lance Armstrong Foundation, and will also be sponsored by Trek Bicycle Corporation, SRAM Corporation and Nike, Inc. sportswear.

The team ceased to exist in its current structure from the end of the 2011 season as Radioshack returned their World Tour Licence to the UCI. Their two main sponsors, RadioShack and Nissan, moved their sponsorship to Team Leopard Trek. Sporting Director Johan Bruyneel moved to the newly named RadioShack-Nissan team along with several of the current Radioshack riders. While effectively a merge, there is some debate between the two teams as to the nature of the agreement. Radioshack described it as a merge, while Flavio Becca, owner of Leopard Trek stated that his team was continuing, and simply taking over Radioshacks sponsors, and some of their riders. The new team was registered in Luxembourg with the UCI.

Team history

2010

On November 25, 2009, The UCI ProTour Council (UPTC) announced that the team was successfully registered for the 2010 season   The team's final 2010 team roster includes 26 riders from 16 countries, after Japanese rider Fumiyuki Beppu joined in February. Demol and twelve of the riders were previously with the Kazakh team  in the UCI ProTour, including eight of the team's nine riders on the winning team in the 2009 Tour de France. In April 2010 Li Fuyu was suspended by the team after failing a doping test.

The team had planned on racing in the 2010 Tour de France and the 2010 Vuelta a España, among other races, but it controversially was not invited to the Vuelta.  Team RadioShack went on to achieve the team victory of the 2010 Tour de France, while leading the team classification after about half its stages. It was the second time that an American team had won the team classification, preceded by Discovery Channel in 2007. After the Tour de France, the team promoted Taylor Phinney and Jesse Sergent from the Trek-Livestrong U23 team and Clinton Avery from the PWS Eijssen team to the RadioShack roster as "stagiaires" ("trainees" in French) for the remainder of the season.

2011

The 2011 season for  began in January at the Tour Down Under, and ended in October with Robbie McEwen's participation in the Noosa Grand Prix. As a UCI ProTeam, they were automatically invited and obligated to send a squad to every event in the UCI World Tour.

While the team had 28 wins in 2011, and showed well enough to briefly be the leading team in the UCI World Tour rankings, they were nearly invisible in the Grand Tours, the races which have defined manager Johan Bruyneel's managerial career. A Tour de France besieged by crashes and injuries led to Haimar Zubeldia in 15th place being their best finisher, the worst showing for a Bruyneel-led team at the Tour in five years. The team's principal successes were the three major stage races in the United States, the Tour of California, the Tour of Utah, and the USA Pro Cycling Challenge. Team RadioShack fielded the overall winner in all three events, Chris Horner in California and Levi Leipheimer in Utah and Colorado. The team also won seven other stage races, easily the most of any major team on the season.

2011 team roster
As at December 31, 2011.

2012 Bontrager-Livestrong U23 team roster
As of December 31, 2012.

List of wins

2010
 Stage 4 Volta ao Algarve, Sébastien Rosseler
 Portuguese rider classification, Tiago Machado
 Teams classification
  Teams classification Giro di Sardegna
  Youth classification Critérium International, Tiago Machado
  Teams classification
 Stage 2b Circuit de la Sarthe, Tiago Machado
 Overall  Tour of the Basque Country, Chris Horner
Stage 6,  Chris Horner
 De Brabantse Pijl, Sébastien Rosseler
  Teams classification, Vuelta a Castilla y León
  Teams classification, Tour de Romandie
 Overall  Tour of the Gila, Levi Leipheimer
Stage 1, Levi Leipheimer
 Stage 5 Tour of Belgium, Ben Hermans
  Teams classification Tour de Luxembourg
 Overall  Critérium du Dauphiné, Janez Brajkovič
Stage 4, Janez Brajkovič
  Teams classification Tour of Austria
  Teams classification Tour de France
Stage 10, Sergio Paulinho
 Overall  Tour de l'Ain, Haimar Zubeldia
Prologue, Haimar Zubeldia
 Overall  Tour of Utah, Levi Leipheimer
Prologue, Taylor Phinney
Stage 3, Levi Leipheimer
 Stage 4 Tour du Poitou-Charentes, Markel Irizar
 Prologue Tour de l'Avenir, Taylor Phinney
 Leadville Trail 100 MTB, Levi Leipheimer
  National Time Trial championships, Taylor Phinney
  World U23 Road Race championships, Taylor Phinney
2011
 Trofeo Inca-inca, Ben Hermans
 Tour De Mumbai II, Robbie Hunter
 Overall  Vuelta a Andalucía Ruta ciclista del Sol, Markel Irizar
 Overall  Driedaagse van West-Vlaanderen, Jesse Sergent
Prologue Jesse Sergent
 Stage 5 Paris–Nice, Andréas Klöden
 Stage 4 Volta Ciclista a Catalunya, Manuel Cardoso
 Stage 3 Critérium International, Andréas Klöden
 Overall  Three Days of De Panne, Sébastien Rosseler
 Overall  Tour of the Basque Country, Andréas Klöden
 Stage 1 Giro del Trentino, Andréas Klöden
 Overall  Amgen Tour of California, Chris Horner
Stage 4, Chris Horner
Stage 7, Levi Leipheimer
  National Road Race championships, Matthew Busche
  National Time Trial championships, Fumiyuki Beppu
 Overall Tour de Suisse, Levi Leipheimer
  National Time Trial championships, Nelson Oliveira
  National Road Racec championships, Fumiyuki Beppu
  National Time Trial championships, Janez Brajkovič
 Stage 1 Tour of Austria, Robert Hunter
 Stage 4 Tour de Wallonie, Robbie McEwen
 Stage 5 Eneco Tour, Jesse Sergent
 Overall Tour of Utah, Levi Leipheimer
 Overall  USA Pro Cycling Challenge, Levi Leipheimer
Stages 1 & 3, Levi Leipheimer
 Overall  Tour du Poitou-Charentes, Jesse Sergent
Stage 4, Jesse Sergent
 Overall  Tour de Wallonie-Picarde, Robbie McEwen
Stages 1 & 4, Robbie McEwen

Supplementary statistics
Sources

National championships
2010
 USA Road Race Ben King
 USA Time Trial Taylor Phinney
 U23 World Road Race Taylor Phinney
2011
 Japan Road Race Fumiyuki Beppu
 Japan Time Trial Fumiyuki Beppu
 USA Road Race Matthew Busche
 Slovenia Time Trial Janez Brajkovič
 Portugal Time Trial Nelson Oliveira

References

External links

 
 UCI Team Profile
 Building the Team RadioShack Trek Madone on YouTube
 Trek-Livestrong U23

Defunct cycling teams based in the United States
Former UCI WorldTeams
RadioShack
Cycling teams established in 2009
Cycling teams disestablished in 2011
2009 establishments in the United States
2011 disestablishments in the United States